The Howard University School of Communications ("School of C") has four departments offering undergraduate and graduate degrees. The Departments of Communication and Culture, Journalism, and Radio-Television-Film offer the Bachelor of Arts degree in ten specializations. The Department of Communication Sciences and Disorders offers the Bachelor of Science degree in Speech Pathology/Audiology. All departments offer 18-hour minor sequences.

in 2013, Gracie Lawson-Borders, a former reporter and editor for the Chicago Tribune and Akron Beacon Journal, was named Dean, effective July 1. She replaces Jannette L. Dates.  She is the former associate dean of the College of Arts and Sciences at the University of Wyoming, where she also was professor of communication and journalism and director of the African American and Diaspora Studies program.

Howard University owns and operates WHUR-FM 96.3 FM and WHUT-TV.  The two media stations serve as training centers for students pursuing communication degrees and careers.

References

Communications
Film schools in the United States